The Exeter-class ships of the line were a class of four 64-gun third rates, designed for the Royal Navy by William Bateley.

Design
The draught for Exeter was based upon the s of 1757.

Ships 

Builder: Henniker, Chatham
Ordered: 13 January 1760
Launched: 26 July 1764
Fate: Burned, 1785

Builder: Adams, Lepe, Hampshire
Ordered: 16 December 1761
Launched: 21 April 1765
Fate: Broken up, 1814

Builder: Plymouth Dockyard
Ordered: 4 December 1762
Launched: 20 April 1768
Fate: Sold out of the service, 1816

Builder: Woolwich Dockyard
Ordered: 7 January 1762
Launched: 28 September 1768
Fate: Sold out of the service, 1814

References

Lavery, Brian (2003) The Ship of the Line – Volume 1: The development of the battlefleet 1650–1850. Conway Maritime Press. .

 
Ship of the line classes